Elections to Perth and Kinross Council were held on 3 May 2012, the same day as the other Scottish local government elections. The election used the twelve wards created as a result of the Local Governance (Scotland) Act 2004, with each ward electing three or four councillors using the single transferable vote system a form of proportional representation, with 41 Councillors being elected.

The council was previously controlled by a Liberal Democrat/Scottish National Party coalition administration from 2007 to 2012.

The 2012 elections saw the SNP remain the main party by a significant margin but they did not make further advances. Both the Conservatives and the Liberal Democrats lost seats to Independents who returned to the Council having been wiped out in 2007. Following the election a Scottish National Party minority administration took over the running of the council with the support of the Scottish Conservative and Unionist Party.

Election results

Note: "Votes" are the first preference votes. The net gain/loss and percentage changes relate to the result of the previous Scottish local elections on 3 May 2007. This may differ from other published sources showing gain/loss relative to seats held at dissolution of Scotland's councils.

Ward results

Carse of Gowrie
2007: 2xSNP; 1xCon
2012: 2xSNP; 1xCon
2007-2012 Change: No change

Strathmore
2007: 2xSNP; 1xCon; 1xLib Dem
2012: 2xSNP; 1xCon; 1xLib Dem
2007-2012 Change: No change

Blairgowrie and Glens
2007: 2xSNP; 1xCon
2012: 2xSNP; 1xCon
2007-2012 Change: No change

Highland
2007: 2xSNP; 1xCon
2012: 2xSNP; 1xCon
2007-2012 Change: No change

Strathtay
2007: 2xSNP; 1xCon
2012: 2xSNP; 1xCon
2007-2012 Change: No change

Strathearn
2007: 2xCon; 1xSNP
2012: 1xSNP; 1xCon; 1xPICP
2007-2012 Change: PICP gain one seat from Con

Strathallan
2007: 1xSNP; 1xCon; 1xLib Dem
2012: 1xCon; 1xSNP; 1xLib Dem
2007-2012 Change: No change

Kinross-shire
2007: 2xLib Dem; 1xSNP; 1xCon
2012: 2xIndependent; 1xLib Dem; 1xSNP
2007-2012 Change: Independent gain from Lib Dem and Con

Almond and Earn
2007: 1xSNP; 1xCon; 1xLib Dem
2012: 1xCon; 1xSNP; 1xIndependent
2007-2012 Change: Independent gain from Lib Dem

Perth City South
2007: 2xLib Dem; 1xCon; 1xSNP
2012: 1xLib Dem; 1xCon; 1xSNP; 1xLab
2007-2012 Change: Lab gain from Lib Dem

Perth City North
2007: 2xSNP; 2xLab
2012: 2xSNP; 2xLab
2007-2012 Change: No change

Perth City Centre
2007: 1xSNP; 1xLib Dem; 1xCon; 1xLab
2012: 1xSNP; 1xLib Dem; 1xLab; 1xCon
2007-2012 Change: No change

Post Election Changes
† On 24 March 2015 Perth City Centre SNP Cllr Jack Coburn announced he was standing down from the council for health reasons.By-election date confirmed - Perth & Kinross Council. A by-election was held to fill the vacancy on 7 May 2015 and the seat was retained by the SNP's Andrew Parrott.
†† On 31 January 2016 Almond and Earn Independent Cllr Alan Jack died after a short illness.Tributes paid to 'Mr Bridge of Earn' councillor Alan Jack A by-election was held on 7 April 2016 and the seat was won by the Conservative's Kathleen Baird.

By-Elections since 2012

References 

2012 Scottish local elections
2012